Goran Djuricin (born 16 October 1974) is an Austrian football coach and former player, who is manager of SV Stripfing/Weiden. Djuricin played professionally as a forward and is best remembered for his six years with Austria Wien. As a manager, his highest-profile roles were with SK Rapid Wien, FC Blau-Weiß Linz and Grasshoppers. He is the father of Austrian international forward Marco Djuricin.

Club career 
A forward, Djuricin joined Austrian Bundesliga side Austria Wien in 1991 and made 15 appearances and scored one goal before departing in 1997. The high points of his time with Austria Wien were a late substitute appearance in the 1994 Austrian Supercup (which was lost 2–1 to Austria Salzburg) and two 1994–95 European Cup Winners' Cup appearances versus NK Branik Maribor. He dropped into lower-league football and played for SK Vorwärts Steyr, Würnitz, St. Andrä-Wördern, Kapellerfeld and SV Donau before retiring in 2007.

Management career 
Djuricin has had a long career as a manager and assistant manager at club and international level. He held assistant manager positions with the Austrian U18, U19 and U20 international teams between 2008 and 2011 and was involved at the 2011 U20 World Cup. He managed ASK Ebreichsdorf between 2012 and 2016 and won the Landesliga Niederösterreich title in the 2014–15 season, to clinch promotion to the Regionalliga Ost. He returned to Austrian Bundesliga club SK Rapid Wien for the third time of his career in November 2016, as assistant manager to Damir Canadi. On 9 April 2017, Djuricin succeeded Canadi as the club's manager. He was sacked on 30 September 2018, and was appointed manager of Second League club FC Blau-Weiß Linz in April 2019 on a two-year contract. A run of one win from 9 league games prior to the 2019–20 winter break led to Djuricin's sacking in December 2019.

On 9 February 2020, Djuricin was announced as manager of Swiss Challenge League club Grasshoppers until 30 May 2020. He won one of two league matches before the season was halted due to the COVID-19 pandemic. On 15 May and with the Swiss Challenge League having yet failed to resume, it was announced that Djuricin's contract would not be renewed. In December 2021, Djuricin was appointed as assistant to new manager Andreas Heraf at 3. Liga club Türkgücü München and continued in the role until the club's insolvency late in the season. Following a period coaching and advising SV Gerasdorf/Stammersdorf (whom he had also served between his Grasshoppers and Türkgücü München roles), Djuricin was appointed manager of Austrian Regionalliga East club SV Stripfing/Weiden in May 2022.

Personal life 
Djuricin's son, Marco Djuricin, is an Austrian international footballer. He is of Serbian and Croatian descent.

Honours 
ASK Ebreichsdorf
 Landesliga Niederösterreich: 2014–15

References

External links
 
 

1974 births
Living people
Footballers from Vienna
Austrian footballers
Association football forwards
SK Rapid Wien players
FK Austria Wien players
SK Vorwärts Steyr players
Austrian Football Bundesliga players
Austrian people of Serbian descent
Austrian people of Croatian descent
SK Rapid Wien managers
Austrian Football Bundesliga managers
Austrian football managers
Grasshopper Club Zürich managers
Austrian expatriate sportspeople in Switzerland
Austrian expatriate football managers
Expatriate football managers in Switzerland